Ethalia striolata is a species of sea snail, a marine gastropod mollusk in the family Trochidae, the top snails.

Description
The subglobulose, subperforate shell has a discoidal shape and is transversely striate. The five whorls are slightly convex. They are ornamented with very narrow transverse,
white articulated lines. The base of the shell is smooth, reddish-brown maculated at the periphery, with a reddish zone around the umbilical region. The callus is white, small, partly concealing the umbilicus. The aperture is oval.

Distribution
This marine species occurs in the Red Sea, off Mozambique, East Africa, Central and East Indian Ocean, Indo-Malaysia, Indonesia, Cocos Keeling Islands. and off Borneo.

References

 Adams, A. 1855. A monograph of Umbonium (Rotella), a genus of Trochidae. Proceedings of the Zoological Society of London 1853(21): 187-189 
 Maes, V.O. 1967. The littoral marine mollusks of Cocos-Keeling Islands (Indian Ocean). Proceedings of the Academy of Natural Sciences, Philadelphia 119: 93-217 
 Kilburn, R.N. 1977. Taxonomic studies on the marine Mollusca of southern Africa and Mozambique. Part 1. Annals of the Natal Museum 23(1): 173-214

External links
 To Biodiversity Heritage Library (8 publications)
 To World Register of Marine Species

striolata
Gastropods described in 1855